The Trafford Park Development Corporation was established in 1987 to develop land in Trafford and Salford. Its flagship developments included the Quay West office development at Wharfside, Trafford Park Village and Northbank Industrial Park. During its lifetime 8.3m sq.ft. of non-housing development and 461 housing units were built. Around 25,618 new jobs were created and some £1,560 million of private finance was leveraged in.
The chairman was Bill Morgan and the chief executive was Mike Shields. It was dissolved in 1998.

References

External links
 Trafford Park Development Corporation

Organisations based in Trafford
Salford
Organizations established in 1987
Organizations disestablished in 1998
Defunct public bodies of the United Kingdom
Development Corporations of the United Kingdom